The Radstadt Tauern are a subrange of the Central Eastern Alps in Austria. Together with the Schladming Tauern, the Rottenmann and Wölz Tauern and the Seckau Tauern the Radstadt Tauern form the major range of mountains known as the Low Tauern. The mountains are found in the southeast of the Austrian state of Salzburg, between the upper reaches of the Enns and Mur rivers.

Geography

Location 
The Radstadt Tauern form the westernmost part of the Low  Tauern range. They are bounded to the southwest by the High Tauern, to the northwest by the Salzburg Pongau region, and to the east by the Schladming Tauern. Their name is derived from the historic town of Radstadt in the Enns valley.

Neighbouring ranges 
The Radstadt Tauern border on the following other mountain ranges of the Alps:
 Schladming Tauern (to the east)
 Nock Mountains (Gurktal Alps; to the southeast)
 Ankogel Group (High Tauern; to the west)
 Salzburg Slate Alps (to the north)

Boundary 
According to the Alpine Club classification of the Eastern Alps (AVE), the mountains are bounded by the following line, in a clockwise direction:
Wagrainer Bach from its confluence with the Salzach – Wagrainer Höhe – Litzlingbach to its confluence with the Enns – Enns to Radstadt – Northern Taurach valley – Obertauern – Southern Taurach valley – Mauterndorf – Neuseß – Mur – Murtörl Pass – Kreealpenbach – Großarlbach to its confluence with the Salzach – Salzach to its confluence with the Wagrainer Bach.

Communications 
The eastern edge of the Radstadt Tauern is crossed by the Radstädter Tauern Pass and, since 1975, by the Tauern Road Tunnel of the Tauern Autobahn (A10).

In the north and south of the range, the Enns Valley and Mur Valley Railway lines, as well as parallel federal roads (Bundesstraßen) run along the upper Enns and upper Mur valleys.

Peaks 
Its highest summits are the Weißeck, the Hochfeind and the Mosermandl.

Tourism

Alpine huts 
 Südwiener Hut, 1,802 m
 Franz Fischer Hut, 2,001 m
 Stickler Hut, 1,752 m
 Speiereck Hut, 2,074 m
 Gnadenalm, 1,290 m
 Tappenkarsee Hut, 1,820 m
 Draugstein Hut, 1,714 m
 Kleinarler Hut, 1,754 m

Ski regions 
Skiing in the Radstadt Tauern is concentrated around the village of Obertauern and in the ski areas in the north and northwest, near Altenmarkt-Zauchensee or Flachau. The Radstadt Tauern are also well known for their ski touring terrain.

References

External links
 Gnadenalm Obertauern

 
Mountain ranges of the Alps
Mountain ranges of Salzburg (state)